Bart "Barry" van Galen (born 4 April 1970, in Haarlem) is a Dutch former professional footballer. He debuted in Dutch professional football on 17 August 1991 (Haarlem - Telstar 2–1) and internationally for the Netherlands national team on 17 November 2004 against Andorra. His playing career ended in 2006 and he scouted for AZ until 2019.

External links

1970 births
Living people
Association football midfielders
Dutch footballers
Footballers from Haarlem
Netherlands international footballers
Eredivisie players
Eerste Divisie players
HFC Haarlem players
Roda JC Kerkrade players
NAC Breda players
AZ Alkmaar players
AZ Alkmaar non-playing staff